Coryanthes gerlachiana is a species of orchid endemic to Bolivia.

References

External links

gerlachiana
Orchids of Bolivia